Terry Cavanagh may refer to:

 Terry Cavanagh (politician) (1926–2017), Canadian politician
 Terry Cavanagh (developer) (born 1984), Irish video game designer

See also
 Terry Kavanagh, American comic book editor and writer